Nicola Antonio Stigliola (Also: Colantonio Stelliola) (1546 Nola – 1623 Naples) was an Italian philosopher, printer, architect, and medical doctor. He was a friend to Tommaso Campanella and Giordano Bruno and a member of the Accademia dei Lincei.

He was an adherent of Copernican heliocentrism and of Bruno's ideas on Hermeticism and magic. He believed in the complex Pythagorean and Brunian cosmologies, including the view that the planets and stars were like the earth, covered in plants and animals:
"Stigliola said to me...that it seemed irrational to him that bodies so much larger than the earth and the space between the centre of the earth to the moon should be composed simply of idle fire, and not instead of all manner of elements and plants and animals and men, just as our countryman Philolaus held."
Indeed, Stigliola and Bruno were born just two years apart in the same region of southern Italy, Nola, and in the same town of Monte Cicala.

Early studies and life in Naples
Stigliola studied medicine at the University of Salerno, gaining his degree in 1571, after which he lived in Naples. There, he published "Theriace et Mithridatia Libellus" (1577), a polemic defending his teacher Maranta on the use of theria (a subclass of mammals), against the medical school at Padua - an effort that meant he could not progress as a medical student.
Instead, he turned his attentions to architecture and teaching. He became, in the 1580s, topographer to the city of Naples, and developed new plans for the city's port and city wall, neither of which were implemented. Instead, he turned to teaching, perhaps medicine as well as architecture. He was said to have had, at one time, 400 students.
He also turned his hand to the very risky business of printing, establishing a press on the Porta Reale from 1593 to 1606. Eighty-two of these printed works are known today and the press was "one of the greatest of his day".
He was tried for heresy in Naples in 1595.

His epitaph, in part, reads:
TO THE MEMBER OF THE LYNCEAN ACADEMY,
NICOLA ANTONIO STIGLIOLA,
NOT ONLY A PHILOSOPHER, BUT DISTINGUISHED
IN ALL THE LIBERAL ARTS
IN ADDITION TO THE PHYSICAL SCIENCES, POLITICS, ETHICS, 
ARCHITECTURE, MILITARY ARTS, AND
ALL THAT PERTAINS TO THE PYTHAGOREAN SCIENCES
ENDED HIS CAREER AS THE SUPREME MATHEMATICIAN
IN THE CITY OF PARTHENOPE
AT THE AGE OF NEARLY EIGHTY YEARS
ON APRIL 11, 1623...

The following are works by Stigliola:
Theriace et Mithridatia Libellus (1577)
De gli elementi mechanici (1597)
Telescopio, over ispecillo celeste (1627 posth.)
Encyclopedia pythagorea (1616) [Only the index and section Delle apparenze celesti (1616) are believed to exist]

References

1546 births
1623 deaths
People from Nola
Hermeticists
16th-century Italian architects
Italian philosophers
Members of the Lincean Academy